Pramod Reang is an Indian social worker and politician representing Santirbazar Assembly constituency in the Tripura Legislative Assembly. He is also candidate of the BJP for the 2023 Tripura Legislative Assembly election.

References

Living people
People from South Tripura district
Tripura MLAs 2018–2023
Bharatiya Janata Party politicians from Tripura
Year of birth missing (living people)